Arosio (locally ) is a comune (municipality) in the Province of Como in the Italian region Lombardy, located about  north of Milan and about  southeast of Como.

Arosio borders the following municipalities: Carugo, Giussano, Inverigo.

Arosio is a valuable town in Brianza a geographical area at the foot of the Alps, and is a part of the Parco della Valle del Lambro.
It is crossed by two important roads named Nuova Vallassina and Novedratese

The town hosted the Institute for Invalids where Don Carlo Gnocchi founded the Federation for Mutilated Children, in 1952 began the Juvenile Foundation, today known as the Don Carlo Gnocchi – ONLUS Foundation.

The bird observatory Osservatorio Ornitologico di Arosio was established in 1710. It has a museum.

Demographic evolution

References

External links
 www.comune.arosio.como.it
 Parco della valle del Lambro
 Percorsi in Brianza
 Parco della valle del Lambro regione Lombardia
 Don Carlo Gnocchi ONLUS
 Don Carlo Gnocchi – Film
 FEIN Bird observatory

Cities and towns in Lombardy